William Alfred Robinson (12 July 1905 – 15 November 1957) was a Liberal party member of the House of Commons of Canada. He was born in Penetanguishene, Ontario.

He studied in Toronto at Upper Canada College and the University of Toronto after which he became a barrister. Robinson became Mayor of Midland, Ontario in 1945.

Robinson was first elected to Parliament at the Simcoe East riding in the 1945 general election then re-elected for successive terms in 1949 and 1953. He was Deputy Speaker of the House of Commons during the 22nd Canadian Parliament from 1953 to 1957, and also served as Chairman of the Committees of the Whole. After this term of office, Robinson was defeated by Philip Bernard Rynard of the Progressive Conservative party in the 1957 election.

References

External links
 

1905 births
1957 deaths
Liberal Party of Canada MPs
Mayors of places in Ontario
Members of the House of Commons of Canada from Ontario
Lawyers in Ontario